This is the list of awards and nominations received by the television series Boardwalk Empire.

Emmy Awards

Primetime Emmy Awards

Creative Arts Emmy Awards

Directors Guild of America Award

Golden Globe Awards

Location Managers Guild of America Awards

Screen Actors Guild Awards

Visual Effects Society Awards

Writers Guild of America Awards

References

awards
Lists of awards by television series